Zachary Muburi-Muita (born in 1957) is a  Kenyan politician who from 2010 until June 2013 served as the Head of the United Nations Office to the African Union. He was then replaced by Haile Menkerios

Career
Muburi-Muita became involved with the Kenyan Government in 1982, where his positions included serving as High Commissioner to the United Republic of Tanzania and standing as main Counsellor at the Kenya Embassy in Israel. In 2006, he became Kenya's Permanent Representative to the United Nations in New York City. Concurrently, he served as the Vice-President of the Bureau of the Assembly of States Parties to the Rome Statute of the International Criminal Court. In January 2010 he was elected President of the United Nations High-Level Committee on South-South Cooperation a central body in the governance structure of South-South Cooperation within the UN System that manages the intergovernmental review and policymaking of South-South Cooperation.

External links 
UN Biography Zachary Muburi-Muita

1957 births
Living people
Kenyan diplomats
Kenyan officials of the United Nations
University of Nairobi alumni
Alumni of the University of Oxford
High Commissioners of Kenya to Tanzania
Permanent Representatives of Kenya to the United Nations